Young Blood F.C. is a football club from Sahiwal, Pakistan. They play at the 5,000 capacity Ali Nawaz Stadium. It was founded in 1983.

Football clubs in Pakistan
Sport in Punjab, Pakistan
Association football clubs established in 1983
1983 establishments in Pakistan